The Chief of the Military Staff of the President of the Republic (Chef d'état-major particulier du président de la République) is a role in the military and government of France, heading the president's military staff until the French Fifth Republic.

Heads of the president's military household (1879–1940) 
The President's 'military household' (maison militaire) was formed by president Mac-Mahon but not institutionalised until 1880. This group of officers advised the president on army matters, especially (under the French Third Republic) matters of ceremony. Such an allocation was useful since it allowed its officers to nourish political contacts in Paris who could aid their army careers. 

 1879–1886 : général de division François Pittié
 1886–1892 : général de brigade, then de division Henri Brugère
 1892–1894 : général de brigade, then de division Léon Borius
 1894–1895 : général de brigade Ulysse Berruyer
 1895–1897 : général de brigade Charles Tournier
 1897–1898 : général de brigade Alexis Hagron
 1898–1900 : général de brigade Maurice Bailloud
 1900–1906 : général de brigade, then de division Émile Dubois
 1906–1907 : colonel Charles Ebener
 1908–1911 : capitaine de vaisseau Alexandre Laugier
 1911–1913 : capitaine de vaisseau Marcel Grandclément
 1913–1914 : général de division Antoine Beaudemoulin
 1919–1920 : général de division Jean-Baptiste Pénelon
 1920–1924 : général de division Henri Lasson
 1931–1940 : général de corps d'armée Joseph Braconnier

President's chief of staff 

The 'chef d’état-major particulier' (CEMP) is the chief military adviser to the French president.  The president serves as commander-in-chief of the French armed forces. As interface between the military and the president, the CEMP plays a vital role in putting into practice nuclear deterrence. The CEMP usually goes on to become chef d’état-major des armées.

général de division Henri Grout de Beaufort : January 1959 – 1960
général de corps d'armée Jean Olié : 1960 – 1961
général Louis Dodelier : 1961 – 1962
général de brigade aérienne Gabriel Gauthier : 1962 – 1964
vice-amiral Jean Philippon : 1964 – 1967
général de division André Lalande : 1967 – 1969
général Jean Deguil : 1969 – 1971 
général d'armée Michel Thénoz : 1972 – 1974
général d'armée Guy Méry : June 1974 – July 1975
général d'armée Claude Vanbremeersch : July 1975 – 1979 
général Bertrand de Montaüdouin : 1979 – 1981 
général d'armée aérienne Jean-Michel Saulnier : 1981 – 1985 
général Gilbert Forray : 1985 – July 1987 
général Jean Fleury : 31 July 1987 – April 1989
amiral Jacques Lanxade : April 1989 – 23 April 1991
général de division Christian Quesnot :  24 April 1991 – 7 September 1995
vice-amiral Jean-Luc Delaunay : 8 September 1995 – 29 April 1999
général de division Henri Bentégeat : 30 April 1999 – 24 October 2002
général d'armée Jean-Louis Georgelin : 25 October 2002 – 3 October 2006
vice-amiral d'escadre Édouard Guillaud : 4 October 2006 – 24 February 2010
général de corps d'armée Benoît Puga : 5 March 2010 – 6 July 2016
amiral Bernard Rogel : 13 July 2016 – 1 August 2020
amiral Jean-Philippe Rolland : Since 1 August 2020

Sources and references 

French military staff